Aliens Live is the first live album by English singer Kim Wilde, released on 16 August 2019. The album was recorded in 18 cities during the 2018 live tour.

Track listing
 "Stereo Shot"
 "Water on Glass"
 "Never Trust a Stranger"
 "Kandy Krush"
 "Cambodia"
 "Birthday"
 "Yours 'til the End"
 "Solstice"
 "Words Fell Down"
 "Bladerunner"
 "Rosetta"
 "Cyber.Nation.War"
 'View from a Bridge"
 "Chequered Love"
 "You Came"
 'You Keep Me Hangin' On"
 "1969"
 "Pop Don't Stop"
 "Kids in America"

Charts

References

2019 albums
Kim Wilde albums